Julianna Miskolczi (born 22 November 1983) is a Hungarian sports shooter. She competed in the women's 10 metre air rifle event at the 2016 Summer Olympics.

References

External links
 

1983 births
Living people
Hungarian female sport shooters
Olympic shooters of Hungary
Shooters at the 2016 Summer Olympics
Place of birth missing (living people)
European Games competitors for Hungary
Shooters at the 2015 European Games
21st-century Hungarian women